Claire Rochelle (1908–1981) was an American film actress. She played the female lead in a number of westerns.

Selected filmography

 Tanned Legs (1929)
 It's Great to Be Alive (1933)
 Music in the Air (1934)
 Skybound (1935)
 I'll Name the Murderer (1936)
 Colleen (1936)
 Empty Saddles (1936)
 After the Thin Man (1936)
 Boothill Brigade (1937)
 Thanks for Listening (1937)
 Guns in the Dark (1937)
 She's Dangerous (1937)
 Ridin' the Lone Trail (1937)
 The Girl Said No (1937)
 Start Cheering (1938)
 El Diablo Rides (1939)
 Two Gun Troubador (1939)
 Should a Girl Marry? (1939)
 Code of the Fearless (1939)
 Missing Daughters (1939)
 The Pal from Texas (1939)
 Long Shot (1939)
 Riders of the Sage (1939)
 The Kid from Santa Fe (1940)
 Buzzy Rides the Range (1940)
 I Love You Again (1940)
 Lightning Strikes West (1940)
 Pot o' Gold (1941)
 North from the Lone Star (1941)
 Gallant Lady (1942)
 The Lone Rider in Texas Justice (1942)
 Secrets of a Co-Ed (1942)
 Harvest Melody (1943)
 Men on Her Mind (1944)
 Double Exposure (1944)
 Shake Hands with Murder (1944)
 Swing Hostess (1944)
 Waterfront (1944)
 Keep Your Powder Dry (1945)
 Blonde for a Day (1946)

References

Bibliography
 Pitts, Michael R. Poverty Row Studios, 1929–1940: An Illustrated History of 55 Independent Film Companies, with a Filmography for Each. McFarland & Company, 2005.

External links

1908 births
1981 deaths
American film actresses
People from  Nevada, Missouri